Kellogg, Oregon is an unincorporated community on the Umpqua River in Douglas County, Oregon, United States, named for brothers Lyman and Adna Barnes Kellogg. The post office operated from January 17, 1879 to 1921. Adna was its first postmaster.

References

Unincorporated communities in Douglas County, Oregon
1879 establishments in Oregon
Populated places established in 1879
Unincorporated communities in Oregon